The Brooskampers (also: Bakabusi Nengre) were a Maroon people, descendants of runaway African slaves, living in the forested interior of Suriname. The tribe is related to the Saramaka, and originated from Loango-Angola. The Brooskampers gained autonomy in 1863, but sold their land in 1917.

History
In the 1740s, the tribe lived in the swamps near Surnau Creek in a camp founded by Tata Kukudabi. In 1772, part of the tribe left and joined the Aluku. In 1862, escaped slaves from plantation Rac à Rac joined the Brooskampers. This was during the preparations of the planned emancipation of the slaves, and therefore the existence of another tribe worried the government. The population of Brooskampers was estimated at about 200 people. At first the government tried to attack them, however the troops got bogged down in the swamp, and had to retreat.

On 2 September 1863, a peace treaty was signed offering the tribe the abandoned plantations Klaverblad and Rorac. No granman (paramount chief) was appointed instead Broos and his brother Kaliko were installed as kabitens (captains).

At first they didn't trust the colonists and hid in the forest behind Klaverblad, however in 1874 the Brooskampers settled at the plantations. In 1891, a temporary church was opened by the Catholic priests who were in Bethesda on the other side of the Suriname River. In 1898, a school was opened, and in 1900, a real church was finished. Klaverblad is no longer mentioned during the 20th century. The almanac of 1910, lists Klaverblad as owned by J. Braumuller. Rorac, on the other hand, is owned by Johannes Babel, the son of Broos and his successor as kabiten. The plantation produced cacao, corn and rice. 

Road surfacing material which was purchased from the village, contained bauxite. In 1917, kabiten Johannes Babel and Alcoa negotiated a deal which was accepted by the tribe,the lands were sold, and the people settled in Tout-Lui-Faut near Paramaribo. In 1920, the last 20 inhabitants were asked to leave and given a ƒ 500,- (€ 2,800 in 2018) moving premium.

In 2011, Alcoa ceased bauxite production at the site. Ronald Babel, one of the descendants, and other family members had restored the damaged graves at the plantation, and erected a Winti shrine at the site.

Notable people
 Ryan Babel (1986), football player

See also
 List of kabitens of the Brooskampers
 Saramaka

References

Bibliography

External links

 Association of Rorac Interests Broos & Kaliko (in Dutch)

Ethnic groups in Suriname
Former populated places in Suriname
Meerzorg
Surinamese Maroons
Bauxite mining in Suriname